The Third Protectorate Parliament sat for one session, from 27 January 1659 until 22 April 1659, with Chaloner Chute and Thomas Bampfylde as the Speakers of the House of Commons. It was a bicameral Parliament, with an Upper House having a power of veto over the Commons.

Events
After the death of Oliver Cromwell his son Richard Cromwell succeeded him as Lord Protector of the Protectorate on 3 September 1658. As a civilian, Richard did not have the full confidence of the Army, particularly as the administration had a perennial budget deficit of half a million pounds and the Army was owed nearly nine hundred thousand pounds in back pay. His only option was to call a Parliament in the hope that it would cement his position by general recognition of the ruling class and by raising new taxes to pay the arrears owed to the Army.

The Third Protectorate Parliament was summoned on 9 December 1658 on the basis of the old franchise, and assembled on 27 January 1659. Richard was recognised as Lord Protector by the Parliament by 223 votes to 134, but over the next month the old divisions re-surfaced. The "Commonwealthsmen" and members of the Rump Parliament (such as Sir Henry Vane, Edmund Ludlow and Sir Arthur Haselrig) wanted to dismantle the Protectorate and return to the Commonwealth which had existed between the regicide of Charles I in January 1649 and the dismissal of the Rump Parliament by Oliver Cromwell in 1653.

The Protectorate faction was led by the Secretary of State John Thurloe, General John Lambert and Major-Generals Charles Fleetwood and Sir John Desborough.  These members wished to keep the Protectorate but were divided over who should command the Army and be Lord Protector.

"The proposition of restoring the Parliament met with great opposition from many of those that had tasted the sweetness of power and profit under the late usurpation of the Cromewells, and who feared a more equal distribution of things; and therefore they everywhere affirmed that there was not a sufficient number of members left to make up a Parliament".

An informal committee of key generals and republican parliamentary members met at Henry Vane the Younger's home at Charing-Cross; representing the army were John Lambert, Col John Hones, Col. Kelsey, Col. Berry, and representing Parliament were Sir Henry Vane, Sir Arthur Haslerig, Major Saloway and Edmund Ludlow.

"The things demanded by those of the army were: 1.  To be secured by an act of indemnity for what was past; 2. That some provision of power might be made for Mr. Richard Cromwell, as well as for the payment of his debts, and future subsistence in a plentiful manner, they having promised to take care of him in these particulars; 3.  That what should stand in need of regulation both in the law and clergy, should be reformed and amended; 4.  That the government of the nation should be by a representative of the people, and by a select senate (chosen in part by the military faction)". Difficulties arose from mistrust between Parliament and the army, making effective working between the two houses problematic.

The issues came to a head when Parliament attempted to impeach Major-General William Boteler for actions he had carried out during the Rule of the Major-Generals in 1656. In response to the attempted impeachment, on 6 April 1659 the Grandees in the Army presented Parliament with a declaration calling for soldiers to be granted immunity from prosecution for all actions carried out during Oliver Cromwell's Protectorate. But accepting that the Commonwealthsmen were in the ascendency in Parliament, Desborough and Fleetwood forced a reluctant Richard Cromwell to use his powers as Lord Protector to dissolve Parliament on 22 April 1659.

The Grandees intended to keep Richard Cromwell as Lord Protector under Army control, without calling another parliament. Their position was undermined, however, when it became clear that the Army's rank and file still harboured support for the "Good Old Cause" of the Commonwealth, and still wanted to have their arrears of pay settled. This groundswell of support forced the Grandees to allow Richard Cromwell to re-call the Rump Parliament less than a month after the dissolution of the Third Protectorate Parliament.

There were two Speakers during the Third Protectorate Parliament and two Deputy Speakers.  Chaloner Chute served as Speaker from 27 January 1659 until 14 April 1659, with two deputy speakers: Sir Lislebone Long from 9 March 1659 until 14 March 1659, and Thomas Bampfield from 16 March 1659 until 14 April 1659.  Thomas Bampfield was Speaker from 15 April 1659 until 22 April 1659.

The Third Protectorate Parliament was preceded by the Second Protectorate Parliament and followed by the return of the Rump Parliament.

Composition

The constituencies and distribution of seats, in England and Wales, for this Parliament reverted to being the same as in the Long Parliament. However the Scottish and Irish constituencies (see list in the First Protectorate Parliament article) remained unchanged.

Constituencies
Abbreviations: Boro' const. – Borough/Burgh constituencies, Shire const. – County/Shire constituencies, Univ. const. or const'ies – University constituencies, Total Const. – Total constituencies, Con. (or Const.) – Constituencies

Table 1: Constituencies and MPs, by type and country

Table 2: Number of seats per constituency, by type and country

Notes: (1) Monmouthshire (1 borough and 2 county seats) included in England, not Wales. (2) Dublin City and County treated as a county constituency (2 seats).

See also
List of parliaments of England
List of MPs elected to the English parliament in 1659

Notes

References
 The British Civil Wars & Commonwealth website: Third Protectorate Parliament 1659
 www.archontology.org: England: Parliament 1640–1660
 Journal of the House of Commons on the British History website

Interregnum (England)
17th-century English parliaments
1659 establishments in England
1659 disestablishments in England
Republicanism in England
The Protectorate
Richard Cromwell